Alexander Julius Fabergé (Russian: Александр Карлович Фаберже; Saint Petersburg, December 17, 1878 – 1952, Paris, France) was the son of Carl Fabergé of the House of Fabergé and his wife Augusta Julia Fabergé. He had four brothers, Eugen Fabergé, Agathon Carl Theodor Fabergé, Nikolai Agathon Fabergé, and Nikolai Leopold Fabergé.

He married firstly Johanna Tamermann and secondly Nina Belichova and had two children, Alexander Cyril and Irina Fabergé.

The October Revolution in Russia was disastrous for the Fabergé business. Most of its clients fled the country, if they were not arrested. The company was “nationalized“, which took the form of all five of its branches being closed. Carl Fabergé himself was able to get out of Russia in September 1918 and died in Switzerland in 1920. His sons did not succeed in leaving at the same time. Alexander Fabergé himself was able to leave in May 1920, travelling first to Helsinki and then on to Southampton on the SS Dongola. From there, he settled first in Germany and finally in France. With his brother Eugen and Andreas Marchetti, Fabergé opened a new store in Paris called Fabergé & Cie.

References 

1878 births
1952 deaths
Alexander Julius Faberge
White Russian emigrants to France